Lathroteles is a monotypic moth genus of the family Crambidae described by John Frederick Gates Clarke in 1971. It contains only one species, Lathroteles obscura J. F. G. Clarke, 1971, which is found on Rapa Iti in French Polynesia.

Lathroteles is the nominate genus of the subfamily Lathrotelinae.

References

Acentropinae
Monotypic moth genera
Moths of Oceania
Crambidae genera